Richmond Castle is a castle built from 1768 to 1769 in Braunschweig, Germany for Princess (later Duchess) Augusta, wife of Karl Wilhelm Ferdinand. It lies near the Oker river in the south of the city. The architect was Carl Christoph Wilhelm Fleischer.

The castle was named after the princess's English home in Richmond Park, a royal park now in the London Borough of Richmond upon Thames.

Architecture 

The castle grounds are located along Wolfenbütteler Straße ("Wolfenbüttel Street") in the city district of Heidberg-Melverode. The building is built in Baroque style, and has a square floor plan with the entrance at one corner.  The state rooms are located on the diagonal, and on either side of these, there are private rooms and a mezzanine floor.  The facade is divided into pedestal, pilaster, and entablature areas, with a balustrade parapet. Projecting avant-corps and perrons (staircases) emphasize the respective ends of the corps de logis.

Compared to the original plan, the designs of the balustrade, staircases, and roof were changed over the course of time. For example, in 1785 the architect Christian Gottlob Langwagen improved the lighting in the central part of the building by installing a roof lantern with 12 windows.

In 1935, the city of Braunschweig acquired the castle grounds from Duke Ernst August. Since 1945, the building has been used for public events. The 18th-century paintings in the interior of the building were restored from 1977 to 1981.

Park 

The park was created along with the castle in 1768, in the style of a classic English landscape garden. Together with the Wörlitzer Park, it is one of the earliest landscape gardens in northern Germany.

The park was designed by the renowned English landscape architect Lancelot "Capability" Brown and is similar in structure and details to Richmond Park, a royal park in the  London Borough of Richmond upon Thames. A special feature of the park are the long lines of sight that extend far into the country from the castle. Brown's intention was possibly to create a peaceful, picturesque, ideal representation of a landscape painting.

Over the years, the original design was modified and adapted to the tastes of the respective era. From 1830, Duke Wilhelm employed the court gardener Johann Christian Burmester to expand the park significantly.  Between 1833 and 1838, more buildings were added – the Ducal Villa and Schloss Neu-Richmond or Williams Castle (which no longer exists).  In addition, larger water areas and an island were created.

The park has been open to the public since 1964. The nearly four-acre park, largely neglected after the end of the Second World War, was reconstructed in 1987 after the historic original design.

Miscellaneous 

The castle is not open every day and can only be visited with a guide. Only the state rooms on the ground floor (the three on the diagonal and two smaller rooms facing the gardens on either side of the diagonal) are accessible to the public, because the first floor is a private residence.

In 1871, a Braunschweig brewery was named after the castle's popular name, Feldschlößchen.  A travelling brewer from Braunschweig took the name to Switzerland and founded the Feldschlösschen brewery in Rheinfelden in 1876.

Since 1982, the Gerstäcker Museum has been housed in the former guard and kitchen house.

Gallery

Sources

External links 
 Richmond Castle as a 3D model in the 3D Warehouse by Google SketchUp

Houses completed in 1769
Buildings and structures in Braunschweig
Castles in Lower Saxony
Baroque architecture in Lower Saxony